During the 1986–87 English football season, Coventry City competed in the Football League First Division.

Season summary
Coventry City won the FA Cup, defeating Tottenham Hotspur, who had spent much of the season competing for a unique domestic treble of the league and the League and FA Cups, 3–2 in a final considered by many to be one of the greatest FA Cup finals of all time. The FA Cup triumph was Coventry's first (and, as of 2014, only) major trophy. The only downside to Coventry's victory was UEFA's decision to extend the ban on English teams competing in European competition to a third season, denying Coventry a place in the European Cup Winners' Cup.

Players

First-team squad
Squad at end of season

Left club during season

Transfers

In
 David Phillips - Manchester City
 Keith Houchen - Scunthorpe United, July, £60,000
 Nick Pickering - Sunderland

Out
 Andy Williams - Rotherham United,  October

Results

FA Cup

Third round 
 Coventry City 3–0 Bolton Wanderers

Fourth round 
 Manchester United 0–1 Coventry City

Fifth round 
 Stoke City 0–1 Coventry City

Sixth Round 
 Sheffield Wednesday 1–3 Coventry City

Semi-final

Final 

After only two minutes, Clive Allen scored his 49th goal of the season, heading past keeper Steve Ogrizovic at the near-post from a perfect Chris Waddle cross. Within seven minutes though, the Sky Blues were level through Dave Bennett, a Cup Final loser in 1981 for Manchester City, ironically at the hands of Spurs.

The London club were back in front five minutes before the break through past defender Gary Mabbutt. Midway through the second half Coventry were level again – Bennett's pinpoint cross from the right was met by striker Keith Houchen with a diving header for a memorable goal.

The scores stayed level until full-time and the game went into extra time. Six minutes in, Mabbutt scored an own goal after Lloyd McGrath centred the ball and it took a deflection off of the Spurs defender's knee and over keeper Ray Clemence.

English League Cup

Second round 
 Coventry City 4-2 Rotherham United (On aggregate)
 1st Leg, Coventry City 3-2 Rotherham United
 2nd Leg, Rotherham United 0-1 Coventry City

Third round 
 Coventry City 2-1 Oldham Athletic

Fourth round 
 Coventry City 0-0 Liverpool
 Replay, Liverpool 3-1 Coventry City

References

Notes

Coventry City F.C. seasons
Coventry City